Jain Vishva Bharati Institute is a deemed university in Rajasthan.

History 

JVBI was established with the inspiration of Acharya Tulsi, the 9th Head of the Jain Svetambar Terapanth religious sect, in Ladnun, Dist Nagaur, Rajasthan. 

In March 1991, Government of India notified JVBI as "Deemed University" under Section 3 of University Grants Commission Act, 1956. The Institute continues to be housed in the common campus of its parent body organization Jain Vishva Bharati. Acharya Tulsi remained its first constitutional Anushasta (moral and spiritual guide) followed by Acharya Mahapragya as its second Anushasta. Acharya Mahashraman is its present Anushasta.

Campus 

The institute is in Ladnun, in Nagaur District of Rajasthan. This university is "A" grade Accredited by NAAC affiliated to UGC,AICTE,BCI and MHRD

Academics

Regular Courses

JVBI undertakes various graduate and post-graduate Regular Programmes as well as doctorate and post-doctorate programmes, such as  D.Lit. & Ph.D. Programmes in Jainology and Comparative Religion & Philosophy; Prachya Vidya evam Bhasha (Sanskrit, Prakrit); Yoga and Science of Living; Nonviolence and Peace; Social Work; Education; and English; M.Phil. Programmes in M.Phil. in Jainology and Comparative Religion & Philosophy; M.Phil. in Prakrit; and M.Phil. in Nonviolence and Peace; Master's degree Courses in M.A./M.Sc. in Jainology; Philosophy; Sanskrit; Prakrit; Hindi; Yoga and Science of Living; Clinical Psychology; Nonviolence and Peace; Political Science; Social Work; English; M.Ed.; Bachelor's degree Courses in B.A. (Bachelor of Arts); B.Com. (Bachelor of Commerce); B.Lib.I.Sc. (Bachelor of Library & Information Science); B.Ed. (Bachelor of Education); B.A.-B.Ed. 4 Yrs Integrated Course; B.Sc.-B.Ed. 4 Yrs Integrated Course; PG Diploma Courses in Jain Studies; Preksha Yoga Therapy; NGO Management; Rural Development; Corporate Social Responsibility; HR Management; Gender Empowerment; Counseling and Communication; Banking; Diploma in Naturopathy ; Rajbhasha Studies; Certificate Courses in Prakrit; Sanskrit, Yoga and Preksha Meditation; SOL, PM & Yoga Education; Nonviolence and Peace; Journalism & Mass Media; Office AUtomation and Internet; Photoshop; and HTML-Web Designing.

Distance Education Courses

JVBI undertakes various post-graduate, graduate and certificate courses, i.e. Master's degree Courses in Jainology; Yoga and Science of Living; Education; Hindi; English; Nonviolence; Bachelor's degree Courses in B.A. (Bachelor of Arts); B.Com. (Bachelor of Commerce); B.Lib. & I.Sc. (Bachelor of Library & Information Science); BPP (Bachelor Preparatory Programme); Certificate Courses in Training in Nonviolence; Understanding Religion; Jain Religion & Philosophy; Prakrit; Jain Art and Aesthetics; Human Rights; and Training Programme Preksha Life Skill.

Faculty

Professor B.R. Dugar, Professor Dept of Nonviolence and Peace is the current Vice Chancellor.

References

Further reading
Jainism: A Pictorial Guide to the Religion of Non-Violence, by Kurt Titze, Klaus Bruhn

External links 
 Official Website

Jain Vishva Bharati Institute
Nagaur district
Educational institutions established in 1991
Deemed universities in India
Jain universities and colleges
1991 establishments in Rajasthan